Earth Defense Force is a series of video games created by Japanese studio Sandlot.

Earth Defense Force may also refer to:
Earth Defense Force (video game), a 1991 video game
Prefectural Earth Defense Force, a 1983 manga, adapted into anime movie
The Mysterians (地球防衛軍, Earth Defense Force), a 1957 Japanese science fiction film
A fictional organization in the film Godzilla: Final Wars
A fictional organization in Dengeki Sentai Changeman
A fictional organization in the Dead Space series
A fictional organization in the Duke Nukem series
A fictional organization in Disgaea: Hour of Darkness
A fictional organization in Red Faction
A fictional organization in the Outer Limits episodes Quality of Mercy and The Light Brigade

See also
Earth Force (disambiguation)
EDF (disambiguation)
Space Force
Global Defence Force